Luvannor Henrique de Sousa Silva (born 19 May 1990), commonly known as Luvannor, is a Moldovan professional footballer who plays as a forward. Born in Brazil, he represents the Moldova national team.

After a few successful seasons with Sheriff Tiraspol in the Moldovan National Division, Luvannor obtained Moldovan citizenship, and in November 2013 he made his debut for Moldova national football team in the friendly match against Lithuania on 18 November, in which he played a major role in the equalizing goal in the 72nd minute. His brother, Klysman also played for Sheriff Tiraspol.

Club career
Luvannor began his career with Paranoá Esporte Clube in 2009, playing in the third division of the Campeonato Brasiliense.

Luvannor signed with Moldovan club Sheriff Tiraspol in 2011. Contract is until 2016. In first 2 seasons Luvannor played as a defender and score only 5 goals. The season 2013-2014 was extremely successful for Luvannor. In the first part of Moldavian Football League he scored 18 goals in 18 matches. Also, his team qualified for the Europa League Group Stage. At home, with Anzhi, he scored from a cross. He put in a spectacular performance against  Tottenham Hotspur in Tiraspol the best player.

On 1 July 2021, Luvannor returned to FC Sheriff Tiraspol.

On 28 August 2021, Luvannor joined Al-Taawoun. On 8 February 2022, Luvannor was released by Al-Taawoun.

International career
In 2013, he acquired Moldovan citizenship and he expressed his desire to play for Moldova national football team. In 2012, he wedded with a Moldovan girl. In the third match for the Moldova national football team against Sweden he scored a  beautiful goal. He also scored in a friendly match against Andorra.
In the summer of 2014 FIFA announced that Luvannor will not be able to play for the national team of Moldova in qualifying for the European Championship 2016. The reason is the lack of a five-year period of residence in Moldova. However, Moldova Football Federation sent an official letter to FIFA with a request to make an exception to the rule and has not yet received a reply, football player can not play for the national team. If the answer is no, then naturalized footballer can not be in the national team until 2016.

Career statistics

Club

International 

Scores and results list Moldova's goal tally first, score column indicates score after each Moldova goal.

Honours
Sheriff Tiraspol	
Moldovan National Division (3) : 2011–12, 2012–13, 2013–14
Moldovan Super Cup (1): 2013
 Runner-Up (2) : 2012, 2014
Moldovan Cup:
 Runner-Up (1) : 2013-14

Individual
Moldovan National Division — Best Goalscorer (1) : 2013–14 (26 goals)

References

External links
 
 
 Henrique Luvannor at fc-sheriff.com
 
 
 
 
 
 

1990 births
Living people
Moldovan footballers
Moldova international footballers
Brazilian footballers
Brazilian emigrants to Moldova
Expatriate footballers in Moldova
Association football forwards
Moldovan Super Liga players
Campeonato Brasileiro Série B players
FC Sheriff Tiraspol players
Al Shabab Al Arabi Club Dubai players
Shabab Al-Ahli Club players
Al Wahda FC players
Al-Taawoun FC players
Cruzeiro Esporte Clube players
Ceará Sporting Club players
UAE Pro League players
Saudi Professional League players
Naturalised citizens of Moldova
Expatriate footballers in the United Arab Emirates
Expatriate footballers in Saudi Arabia
Moldovan expatriate sportspeople in Saudi Arabia
Sportspeople from Piauí